Jill Sheffield is a global educator and advocate for maternal, reproductive, and sexual health and rights and the founder of Women Deliver and Family Care International.

Background
Sheffield's commitment to reproductive rights for women in developing countries began while volunteering in the  family planning clinic at the Pumwani Maternity Hospital in Kenya in the 1960s. It was the first such clinic in East Africa.   While the feminist movement flourished at home in the United States, the Kenyan women Sheffield met through the clinic were legally prohibited from using contraception without their husbands’ permission. This inequity became the driving force in Sheffield's transition from teaching to being a global crusader for women's reproductive, sexual, and maternal rights.

Organizations
In 1987, Sheffield co-founded Family Care International (FCI), a non-profit global organization committed to improving the maternal health of women in the world's poorest nations, and served as its president for 20 years. FCI was the first international organization founded specifically to focus on the plight of the 500,000 women dying in pregnancy and childbirth yearly and to put safe motherhood on the global agenda. In particular, Sheffield and FCI played a critical role in leading the Safe Motherhood Initiative, which helped guide global efforts to improve maternal health since 1987. Under Sheffield, FCI's portfolio grew to implementing projects, conducting evaluations, and finding new solutions and tools to improve maternal health.

In 2007, Sheffield founded Women Deliver – originally a global conference focused on maternal health that evolved into an international advocacy organization dedicated to galvanizing action on maternal health and women's empowerment. Women Deliver works globally to generate political will and commitment and financial investment for Millennium Development Goal 5—reducing maternal mortality and achieving universal access to reproductive health. The organization's message is that maternal health is both a human right and a practical necessity for sustainable development. Women Deliver has organized five large-scale, global conferences on maternal health and is fast becoming the global source of information for advocacy and action on maternal health. The first conference was held in London in 2007 and drew nearly 2,000 participants from 115 countries and the second conference was held in Washington, D.C. in 2010 and drew nearly 3,500 participants from 146 countries. The 2013 conference was held in Kuala LUmpur, Malaysia, and the fourth  Women Deliver global conference took place in Copenhagen, Denmark, in May 2016.  6000 people from more than 150 countries attended.  Sheffield ‘retired’ at the end of the conference.  The 2019 conference in Vancouver, B. C. Attracted 8500 participants from 164 countries.

Other roles and advisory positions
Prior to starting Family Care International, Sheffield served as the executive officer for the Carnegie Corporation of New York's International Program and as Africa and Latin America regional representative for World Education's as well as director of programs. Sheffield has also held several board and advisory positions, including the International Planned Parenthood Federation/Western Hemisphere Region, Population Communications International, Global Fund for Women, and Center for Health and Social Policy. In 2011, Sheffield served as one of 30 commissioners on the UN Commission on Information and Accountability for Women's and Children's Health. The group developed an accountability framework that will help countries monitor where resources go and how they are spent, and will provide the evidence needed to show which programmes are the most effective for saving the lives of women and children.  Sheffield is currently Chair of WomanCareGlobal, Chairs the FIGO Committee on Contraception and Family Planning, serves on the UNFPA Global Advisory Council, acts as External Advisor to the IPPF Governing Council as well as Senior Adviser to Global Health Strategies.

Education
Sheffield received her Master of Arts in comparative and international education from Columbia University and her Bachelor of Arts in education from Glassboro State College.

Honors and awards
The American Public Health Association granted Sheffield its Lifetime Achievement Award in 2008, the same year that Family Care International received the United Nations Population Award for outstanding work in sexual and reproductive health and rights. She has also been recognized as a distinguished alumna by Columbia University's Teachers College for her work in women's and health education.

Published articles and news interviews
 RH Reality Check Blog
 RH Reality Check: Why Women Deliver? Why Now?
 Maternal Health Task Force Blog
 Ms. Magazine Blog
 Al Jazeera

References

Reproductive rights activists
Teachers College, Columbia University alumni
Maternal health